The 2018 NCAA Beach Volleyball Championship was the third annual tournament deciding the NCAA champions for the 2018 collegiate beach volleyball season. It took place May 4-6 in Gulf Shores, Alabama, and was hosted by the University of Alabama at Birmingham. It was a double elimination tournament, with a single championship match.

Qualification
The tournament was open to teams from Divisions I, II, and III. The top three teams each in the East and West Regions qualified automatically, and two additional teams were selected at large. Selections for the tournament were announced on April 29 on NCAA.com.

Bracket

All-Tournament Team
At the conclusion of the championship, the following pairs were announced as members of the All-Tournament Team.

Media Coverage
In December 2017, ESPN was awarded a 5-year contract to provide television coverage of the NCAA Women’s Beach Volleyball Championship, beginning with the 2018 season. In addition, the Selection Show for the championship tournament was broadcast on April 29 at NCAA.com.

Television channels
The 14 dual matches comprising the entirety of the championship were broadcast on the following channels:
 Day 3: National Championship Final (Match/Dual 14) - ESPN
 Day 3: Semifinal/Elimination Bracket, Final (Match/Dual 13) - ESPN2
 Day 2: Third Round and Elimination Bracket, Second Round (Matches/Duals 9-11) - ESPN2
 Day 2: Elimination Bracket, Third Round (Match/Dual 12) - ESPNU 
 Day 1: Opening Rounds - ESPNU (Matches/Duals 1-8)

References

2018 in American sports
2018 in beach volleyball
2018 in women's volleyball
2018 in sports in Alabama